Patrick Oliver Lampson, known professionally as Patrick Brennan, (born December 25, 1972) is an American actor.

Biography
Patrick Brennan is the son of photographer and poet David John Lampson and famed actress Eileen Brennan. He also has a brother, Samuel, who is a professional singer. Patrick started his career as a basketball player while still at Santa Monica College and soon after transferred to Azusa Pacific University. While there, he shifted his focus from sports to theater mostly inspired by his own mother. He acted on stage before appearing on television and film. Some of his most notable roles include Liam in The Twilight Saga: Breaking Dawn – Part 2 and Marcus Daniels on Agents of S.H.I.E.L.D..

Personal life
Brennan has two children; a son born in 2009 and a daughter born in 2013.

Filmography

References

External links
 

Living people
1972 births
Male actors from Los Angeles
21st-century American male actors
American male film actors
Azusa Pacific University alumni